HK Šampion was an ice hockey team in Sarajevo, Bosnia and Herzegovina. Šampion was founded in 2002, and played in the Bosnia and Herzegovina Hockey League in the 2002-03 season, finishing in fourth and last place. The club folded after playing one season in the BHHL.

Results

References

Ice hockey teams in Bosnia and Herzegovina
2002 establishments in Bosnia and Herzegovina
2003 disestablishments in Bosnia and Herzegovina